Mount Hummer is a snow-covered, bluff-type mountain on the southwest side of the head of Chambers Glacier, northeast Saratoga Table, in the Forrestal Range of the Pensacola Mountains, Antarctica. It was named by the Advisory Committee on Antarctic Names in 1979 after Dr. Michael G. Hummer of the Oklahoma Medical Research Foundation, who was a researcher in biomedicine and the physician at South Pole Station in the winter of 1975.

References

Mountains of Queen Elizabeth Land
Pensacola Mountains